"Something So Strong" is a rock song written by Neil Finn and Mitchell Froom and performed by Crowded House for their eponymous debut album (June 1986). The track was released as the album's fifth and final single in April 1987. The single peaked at No. 18 on the Australian Kent Music Report Singles Chart, No. 3 in New Zealand, No. 7 in the United States Billboard Hot 100, and No. 10 on the Canadian RPM 100.

The track lends its title to the book, Crowded House: Something So Strong (1997), by Australian biographer Chris Bourke, which details the band's career from forming to just after their breakup in 1996. According to Bourke, "Something So Strong", was the first song written by Finn specifically for Crowded House. However while in the studio, producer, Froom, and Finn reworked parts of the song and as such, Froom is credited as a co-writer. Demos of this song have been linked to Finn's earlier band Split Enz, from the 1984 See Ya 'Round period, potentially making the timeline earlier on this track.

Music video
A music video was produced to promote the single, of the band singing the song in a barn. A classic American car is parked outside while they perform.

Later uses
The song, though in a different version by Crowded House, plays during the end credits of the 1999 Bryan Brown film, Dear Claudia.

The track is included in the various artists' 3× CD, Flood Relief: Artists for the Flood Appeal (January 2011), which raised money for victims of the Queensland floods. A sample of "Something So Strong" plays during a TV spot of Flood Relief.

Reception
Junkee said the song was, "rightfully revered as a staple in the band’s discography, but admittedly the shine of the original has worn off somewhat with its dated, reverb-heavy production."

Track listings
"Something So Strong" written by Neil Finn and Mitchell Froom. All other songs written by Finn. All tracks from the album "Crowded House", except the two Live tracks on the UK 12" vinyl single, previously released on the "World where you live" US promo cd-single.

Chart history

Weekly charts

Year-end charts

Standard 7" vinyl single
Released in Australia, Japan, Netherlands, United States and United Kingdom.
"Something So Strong" - 2:51
"I Walk Away" - 3:05

US promotional single
Released on 7" and 12" vinyl.
"Something So Strong" - 2:51

US 12" vinyl single
"Something So Strong" - 2:51
"Can't Carry On" - 3:57
"I Walk Away" - 3:05

UK 12" vinyl single
"Something So Strong" - 2:51
"Something So Strong" - 4:02 (live at King Biscuit Flower Hour, The Trocadero, Philadelphia, 24 March 1987)
"I Walk Away" - 3:05
"Don't Dream It's Over" - 5:53 (live at The Roxy, Los Angeles, 26 February 1987)

Personnel

Studio recordings
 Neil Finn - lead vocals and backing vocals, electric guitar
 Nick Seymour - bass and backing vocals
 Paul Hester - drums and backing vocals
 Mitchell Froom - piano

Release history

Notes

External links

1987 singles
Crowded House songs
Songs written by Neil Finn
Songs written by Mitchell Froom
Song recordings produced by Mitchell Froom
1986 songs
Capitol Records singles